Jonas Kazlauskas (1 August 1930, in Matiešionys – 7 October 1970, in Vilnius) was a Lithuanian linguist, expert on the Baltic languages.

In 1954, he graduated from the University of Vilnius. He was the Dean of the Humanities faculty at University of Vilnius. He was one of the founders of the journal, Baltistica.

He died in mysterious circumstances, his body found in the Neris River. It is rumoured that the KGB tried to recruit him, and he refused, leading him to be killed.

References

1930 births
1970 deaths
Balticists

Linguists from Lithuania
Vilnius University alumni
Academic staff of Vilnius University
20th-century linguists
Burials at Saulė Cemetery